Pike Run is a stream in St. Francois County in the U.S. state of Missouri. It is a tributary of Terre Bleue Creek just upstream of that stream's confluence with Big River.

The stream headwaters arise just south of Missouri Route Y about 1.5 miles southeast of Halifax and US Route 67. The stream flows southwest passing just east of St. Francois State Park and on to its confluence with Terre Bleue Creek about two miles west of the community of Hazel Run.

Pike Run was so named on account of its stock of pike fish.

See also
List of rivers of Missouri

References

Rivers of St. Francois County, Missouri
Rivers of Missouri